The Sheikh Zayed Cricket Stadium is a cricket ground located in Abu Dhabi, United Arab Emirates. The stadium cost $23 million to build and was opened in May 2004, with its inaugural first-class match being an Intercontinental Cup fixture between Scotland and Kenya in November of that year. The stadium was one of the dedicated venues for the 2021 ICC Men's T20 World Cup.

The stadium has a large stand at either end, with the areas square of the wicket offering grass banks for additional seating. It can hold 20,000 people.

International fixtures

Among the stadium's most memorable events were two charity matches between rivals Pakistan and India in April 2006. These matches were played to support the survivors of the 2005 Pakistan earthquake. The series was expected to raise $10 million for earthquake relief.

Many other international series have been played on the ground. Following the 2009 attack on the Sri Lanka national cricket team, Pakistan was unable to host home matches and played a number of matches in the UAE, including series against Australia, England, West Indies, New Zealand, South Africa and Sri Lanka

ICC 2021 T20 World Cup 
The 2021 ICC Men's T20 World Cup is the first ICC tournament to be hosted by the UAE. It began on 17 October and will run to 14 November. Four first round matches were hosted in Abu Dhabi, with 10 Super 12 matches and a semi-final also being held at the stadium.

Domestic fixtures 
In 2009, the stadium hosted numerous cricket games, mostly fixtures in the Nissan Gulf Cup, with first-class teams from England and India competing against each other. In March 2009, Sussex, Lancashire, Middlesex and Surrey all played pre-season friendlies on the ground.

The first 20 games of total 60 games of the 2014 Indian Premier League was held in the UAE, with some matches taking place at the stadium. The 2020 Indian Premier League was played in the UAE from September to November, with 20 matches played at the stadium, including the opening match of the tournament. The second half of the next season's league was also played in the UAE from September to October 2021.

Football fixtures
A friendly match between Thailand and Oman was played at the ground in January 2019.

Nursery grounds

The stadium complex also features a pair of smaller grounds called Nursery 1 (also known as Tolerance Oval) and Nursery 2. Tolerance Oval was used for a Twenty20 International between United Arab Emirates and Australia in October 2018. In September 2019, Tolerance Oval was named as one of the venues to host cricket matches for the 2019 ICC T20 World Cup Qualifier tournament.

See also
Abu Dhabi
Sport in the United Arab Emirates
DSC Cricket Stadium
2020 Indian Premier League

References

Cricket grounds in the United Arab Emirates
Sports venues in Abu Dhabi
Multi-purpose stadiums in the United Arab Emirates
Test cricket grounds in the United Arab Emirates
2004 establishments in the United Arab Emirates